Feralia jocosa, the jocose sallow or the joker moth, is a moth of the family Noctuidae. The species was first described by Achille Guenée in 1852. It is found from the northeastern parts of the United States south to Maryland and Ohio, north to Newfoundland and west across the boreal forest to coastal British Columbia. In the lower mainland and Vancouver Island the species is replaced by Feralia deceptiva.

The wingspan is 30–32 mm. The moth flies from April to June depending on the location.

The larvae feed on Pinus species.

References

External links
 Taxonomy

Psaphidinae
Moths of North America
Moths described in 1852